Christoph Friedrich von Ammon (January 16, 1766 – May 21, 1850) was a German theological writer and preacher. He was born at Bayreuth, Bavaria and died at Dresden.

He studied at Erlangen, held various professorships in the philosophical and theological faculties of Erlangen and Göttingen, succeeded Franz Volkmar Reinhard (1753–1812) in 1813 as court preacher and member of the Upper Consistory of the Church of Saxony at Dresden, retired from these offices in 1849.

Seeking to establish for himself a middle position between rationalism and supernaturalism, he declared for a "rational supernaturalism," and contended that there must be a gradual development of Christian doctrine corresponding to the advance of knowledge and science. But at the same time he sought, like other representatives of this school of thought, such as KG Bretschneider and Julius Wegscheider, to keep in close touch with the historical theology of the Protestant churches. The term Offenbarungsrationalismus ("epiphanic rationalism") has been used to express Ammon's intermediate views.

He was a man of great versatility and extensive learning, a philologist and philosopher as well as a theologian, and a very voluminous author. His principal theological work was the "Fortbildung des Christenthums zur Weltreligion", in 4 volumes (Leipzig, 1833–1840); "Entwurf einer reinen biblischen Theologie" appeared in 1792 (2nd edition, 1801), "Summa Theologiae Christianas" in 1803 (other editions, 1808, 1816, 1830); "Das Geschichte des Lebens Jesu" in 1842, and "Die wahre und falsche Orthodoxie" in 1849.

Von Ammon's style in preaching was terse and lively, and some of his discourses are regarded as models of pulpit treatment of political questions.

References

1766 births
1850 deaths
People from Bayreuth
German philologists
German Christian theologians
Academic staff of the University of Erlangen-Nuremberg
Academic staff of the University of Göttingen
Members of the First Chamber of the Diet of the Kingdom of Saxony
19th-century German theologians
German male non-fiction writers
19th-century male writers